James Ray was an English historian, most notable for his chronicle of the Jacobite rebellion of 1745, A Complete History of the Rebellion in 1745: From its first rise, in 1745, to its total suppression at the glorious battle of Culloden, in April 1746 (1749, printed by John Jackson, Petergate, York).

Ray was born in Whitehaven, Cumberland. He marched to join the royal garrison at Carlisle in the autumn of 1745 at the time when Charles Edward Stuart's army was marching from Edinburgh. However Carlisle surrendered to the Jacobites before Ray reached the city, and Ray followed the Jacobite army to Derby. The information he gleaned from this expedition he reported to the Duke of Cumberland, whose forces he met at Stafford on 5 January 1746 and with whom he stayed until the Jacobite forces were finally defeated at Culloden in April.

Ray published The acts of the rebels, written by an Egyptian in 1746 and his history of the Jacobite rebellion.

Notes

18th-century English historians
British Army personnel of the Jacobite rising of 1745
English male non-fiction writers
People from Whitehaven